Avdotyino is a rural locality (a village) in Goretovskoye Rural Settlement of Mozhaysky District, Moscow Oblast, Russia. The population was 7 as of 2010. There are 3 streets.

Geography 
The village is located on the left bank of the Iskona River, 24 km northwest of Mozhaysk (the district's administrative centre) by road. Pereshchapovo is the nearest rural locality.

References 

Rural localities in Moscow Oblast